The Association for Logic Programming (ALP) was founded in 1986. Its mission is "to contribute to the development of Logic Programming, relate it to other formal and also to humanistic sciences, and to promote its uses in academia and industry all over the world". It manages the International Conference on Logic Programming, oversees the journal Theory and Practice of Logic Programming (TPLP), and publishes an electronic newsletter.

The activities of the Association are directed by an Executive Committee and President, elected by ALP members. The current president is Thomas Eiter. Here is a list of all presidents: 
 2022- Thomas Eiter at Vienna University of Technology 
 2019-2021 Thomas Eiter pro tem  at Vienna University of Technology
 2014-2019 Torsten Schaub at the University of Potsdam
 2010-2014 Gopal Gupta at the University of Texas, Dallas
 2005-2009 Manuel Hermenegildo at the Technical University of Madrid
 2001-2004 Veronica Dahl at Simon Fraser University
 1997-2000 Krzysztof R. Apt at Centrum Wiskunde & Informatica in Amsterdam
 1993-1996 David Scott Warren at Stony Brook
 1989-1992 Herve' Gallaire at the European Computer-Industry Research Center in Munich
 1986-1988 Keith Clark at Imperial College London

In 1997, the ALP bestowed to fifteen recognized researchers in logic programming the title Founders of Logic Programming to recognize them as pioneers in the field.

References

External links
Association for Logic Programming (ALP)
Theory and Practice of Logic Programming journal

Computer science organizations
Organizations established in 1986
Computer science-related professional associations